Christopher Alan "Tricky" Stewart (born January 4, 1974) is an American record producer, record executive, songwriter, and music publisher. In a career spanning over 30 years, Stewart has won 5 Grammys and is responsible for over 50 million records sold. He is noted for producing many hip hop, R&B and pop chart topping singles, often with The-Dream. Some of Stewart's record breaking singles are: Mýa's "Case of the Ex" (2000), Britney Spears' "Me Against the Music" (2003), Rihanna's  "Umbrella" (2007), Mary J. Blige's "Just Fine" (2007), Beyoncé's "Single Ladies (Put a Ring On It)" (2008), Karina Pasian's "16 @ War" (2008), Mariah Carey's "Touch My Body" (2008) and "Obsessed" (2009), Justin Bieber's "One Time" (2009) and "Baby" (2010),   Ciara's "Ride" (2010), and Nicole Scherzinger's "Your Love" (2014).

In 2012, he was included in Billboard 40 Under 40, a list of music executives "who are propelling our industry with their artistic and business vision."

In 2020, Stewart signed a publishing deal with Spirit Music Group. The deal covers his future works, as Stewart sold his catalog to Hipgnosis Songs in 2018. Stewart is founder of the record label RedZone Entertainment, which has signed artists such as Frank Ocean.

Early life
Stewart was born in Markham, Illinois. Raised in a musical family, he was playing guitar, playing keyboards and writing songs by the age of 12. His older brother, record producer Laney Stewart, introduced him to one of his first music business mentors, the late Louis Silas, Jr. Silas fostered Stewart's music career by giving him the opportunity to contribute to the projects of several major artists. Before graduating high school, Stewart had placements with artists such as Aaron Hall, rhythm and blues trio IMx, and Chanté Moore. He credits working with Moore opened many doors for his burgeoning music career.

Career

1994–2005
In 1994, Stewart produced "Treat U Right" for Blackgirl. He also met Record Producer and Songwriter L.A. Reid, who offered him a deal to move his first production company to Atlanta. In 1995, with the support of Reid, in partnership with his brother Mark Stewart, and his sister-in-law Judi Stewart-RedZone Entertainment and Triangle Sound Studios were created. RedZone Entertainment is based in Atlanta, but also has a recording studio in Los Angeles.

Stewart's career and reputation continued to soar, with a major breakthrough in 1999 when he co-wrote the single "Who Dat" for JT Money. "Who Dat" was a No. 1 rap single, ASCAP's "Song of the Year", and reached No. 5 on the Billboard pop chart. In addition to producing and writing, he scouted new talent and managed, Stewart jump-started the careers of artists such as Solé and Blu Cantrell.

In 2000, Tricky co-wrote and produced Interscope artist Mýa's breakthrough single "Case of the Ex", It peaked at number 2 on the Billboard Hot 100 in December 2000, and stayed in the Top 10 for three months. While Mya's song was still on top, Stewart discovered and signed Blu Cantrell, and went on to executive produce her debut album So Blu on Arista Records. It peaked at No. 8 on the Billboard 200 album chart and spawned the No. 2 hit "Hit 'em Up Style (Oops!)".

In 2002, Stewart co-produced and co-wrote B2K's debut single, "Uh Huh". It was No. 1 on the Billboard Hot 100 for 10 weeks. In 2003, Blu Cantrell's second album, Bittersweet, was released; it features three songs produced by Stewart, "Unhappy", "Holding on to Love" and "Let Her Go". He also co-wrote and produced a number of songs for Britney Spears's fourth album, In the Zone (2003), including two of its singles, "Me Against the Music" and "Outrageous", as well as "Early Mornin'" and "The Hook Up".

2006–present

2007 was a breakthrough year for Stewart and RedZone Entertainment. Rihanna's single "Umbrella", co-written with The-Dream, garnered two Grammy nominations for Record of the Year and Song of the Year, and a Grammy for "Best Rap/Song Collaboration. In an interview with MTV, Stewart said 

Released in March 2007, "Umbrella" topped the Billboard Hot 100 chart by May, rising 40 spots in one week to land and stay seven straight weeks at number one.  The song also broke the iTunes music store's record for biggest debut ever.  The success brought Rihanna to a new level of fame, co-writer The-Dream went on to debut his own hit record "Love Hate" (executive produced by Stewart), which included the hit single "Shawty is a 10" peaking at No. 6 on the Billboard Hot R&B/Hip-Hop Songs. He also co-wrote and produced Dream's, "Falsetto" and "I Luv Your Girl".  In late 2007, Stewart was working with notable artists as Janet Jackson, Celine Dion (Skies of L.A. off her new album "Taking Chances"), and Usher ("Moving Mountains" and "This Ain't Sex" of his new album Here I Stand).

Stewart was also nominated in 2007 for a Grammy for "Best Female R&B Vocal Performance" on Mary J. Blige's "Just Fine"; that same year, Stewart also co-wrote and produced on the album Growing Pains, as well as the vocals were produced by his production team. The team, composed of Tricky, The-Dream, and Kuk Harrell, proved to be a winning combination. Tricky won his first Grammy for his work on Growing Painsin 2009.

The single "Touch My Body" off Mariah Carey's album in 2008 E=MC², produced by Stewart and Carey was described as "...a No. 1 just waiting to pounce the Billboard Hot 100" by Chuck Taylor of Billboard Magazine. On April 2, 2008 it was announced that "Touch My Body" became Carey's 18th No. 1 single on the Billboard Hot 100, pushing her to second place among artists with the most No. 1 singles in the rock era and first place as a solo artist in the same category, surpassing Elvis Presley. The achievement was attributed to a record-breaking digital sales debut, as 286,000 copies were sold in its first week of availability.

Additionally, in 2008 he produced the songs, "Single Ladies (Put a Ring on It)" for Beyoncé as well as the ballad "Smash into You". "Single Ladies" would later become a pop culture phenomenon due to its female empowerment lyrics, catchy melody and much parodied music video. The song would also win multiple Grammy and MTV Video Music Awards, and remain's Stewart's best-selling single.

He produced a High Price featuring Ludacris for Ciara's 2009 album, Fantasy Ride. He also worked with Japanese-American singer-songwriter Utada on her third English studio album This Is The One which he produced four songs from the record.

Tricky and The-Dream almost exclusively co-wrote (with Mariah) and produced the entirety of Mariah Carey's 2009 album, "Memoirs of an Imperfect Angel".

Tricky and The-Dream executive-produced Ciara's fourth studio album titled Basic Instinct, which was released on December 10, 2010. The lead single from the album titled "Ride", was produced by the duo, the single was released in April 2010 and went on to become Ciara's twelfth top ten hit on the Billboard R&B/Hip-Hop Songs chart.

Stewart contributed to the Christina Aguilera album Bionic, released in June 2010, and produced the score for her debut film, Burlesque, released in November 2010.

Stewart produced the Katy Perry second studio album, named Teenage Dream and was released in 2010. The second promotional single, "Circle the Drain", produced by Tricky was released on iTunes on August 10, 2010.

Stewart was confirmed to be taking part in Jennifer Lopez's eighth studio album "Love?" which was looking at a Summer 2010 releasing alongside The-Dream and Tricky Stewart making it her debut release with Def Jam Records after completing her 10-year contract with Epic Records in February 2010.

Stewart and The Dream teamed up to work on Jessica Simpson's holiday album Happy Christmas.

Discography

Produced singles

Credits

Awards and nominations

References

1974 births
Living people
Musicians from Chicago
People from Markham, Illinois
Record producers from Illinois
Grammy Award winners